Empirix Inc. is a privately held company which designs and manufactures service assurance testing and monitoring equipment for IP-based communications networks such as Voice-over-Internet-Protocol (VoIP), IP Multimedia Subsystem (IMS)-based, next generation network and 4G wireless networks.  Empirix offers enterprise and carrier grade products as well as quality assurance products for network equipment manufacturers.  Empirix is headquartered in Billerica, MA. On April 21st, 2021, Empirix has been acquired by Infovista, a Network automation software. Infovista, which is majority owned by Apax Partners, says the deal “brings together a team of over 1,000 professionals serving over 1,700 customers across more than 150 countries, including 23 of the top 30 CSPs globally.”

Company history
Empirix's Hammer test technology was originally developed at Hammer Technologies, Inc. Hammer Technologies was founded by Steve Gladstone and John Kuenzig in late 1991. Hammer was originally called Transaction Environments, Inc., but changed its name to Hammer Technologies based on the success of their initial "Hammer" test products. The company started by developing test systems for enhanced telecom services (such as voice mail and IVR), but later moved into VoIP, then a new communication technology. The methodologies developed proved viable for testing, and subsequently monitoring, other IP communications applications such as data, video, web and mobile services. Hammer Technologies was purchased by Teradyne in 1995 as part of Teradyne's effort to diversify into more software-oriented test systems.

On September 6, 2000, the Hammer test technology was spun out of Teradyne and became Empirix Inc. Alex d'Arbeloff, co-founder of Teradyne, was appointed chairman of the board.

On June 6, 2008, Empirix sold its e-TEST suite, a set of Web application testing products, to Oracle.  The company then focused on developing products for testing and monitoring voice quality, contact center equipment and enterprise communications networks as well as carrier grade products for mobile, cable and telecom operators.

In 2009, Empirix was awarded the Global VoIP Test & Monitoring Equipment Market Leadership of the Year Award from research firm Frost & Sullivan. In March 2010, Empirix helped found the Network Test Automation Forum (NTAF) to promote interoperability and develop test automation standards in a collaborative, open and transparent manner.

The July 2010 acquisition of Mutina Technology S.p.A. expanded the company's offerings to cover Mobile Broadband (MBB), Next Generation Networks (NGN), SS7/SIGTRAN Signaling, VoD/IPTV, and IP Core for telecom and enterprise networks.

In November 2013, Empirix was acquired by Thoma Bravo LLC, a private equity partnership.

Technology
The company's core Hammer technology was designed to automate the testing of IP communications networks, applications and services.  It models realistic user behavior and emulates the associated session-based, network traffic to measure real-time voice and video quality as well as the performance of the underlying infrastructure.  This capability enables real-world load testing of pre-production VoIP, Unified Communications, IMS, NGN, mobile and other IP-based networks, applications and equipment.  Hammer testing predicts both network traffic issues and the quality of the end-user, customer experience.

Empirix adapted the Hammer test technology to provide on-going monitoring for in-production contact centers, enterprise communications systems as well as telecommunications, cable and mobile operators. Empirix has more than 30 patents and patents-pending.

Applications
Notable deployments of Empirix technology include China Mobile, lastminute.com, National Society for the Prevention of Cruelty to Children, Suddenlink, and Amtrak.

Empirix's partners include Accenture, Avaya, Genesys, IBM, Cisco Systems, Intervoice, Nuance Communications, and Sonus.

Publications and research
Empirix has published a book about testing and monitoring IMS subsystems and services entitled “Ensuring a Quality IMS Experience: A Practical Guide to Testing and Monitoring IP Multimedia Subsystem and Services.” In addition, the company has sponsored a DMG Consulting research study entitled, “Business As Usual? A Benchmarking Study of Disaster Recovery and Business Continuity for Contact Centers.”

Empirix also sponsored the “Companies Unifying the Conversational Contact Center” survey and report created by Opus Research.

Board of directors
The Empirix Board of Directors includes Timothy Barrows, General Partner, Matrix Partners; Cynthia Deysher, President, Deysher Advisory Services; Paul Ferri, General (founding) Partner, Matrix Partners; Gregor N. Ferguson, Empirix Chairman of the Board; John D’Anna, Empirix Chief Executive Officer; and John Guttag, Professor of Computer Science and Engineering at MIT, and Head of Electrical Engineering and Computer Science Department.

Industry Memberships
European Competitive Telecommunications Association

References 

Software companies based in Massachusetts
Companies established in 1992
Telecommunications equipment vendors
Networking companies
Defunct software companies of the United States